Palaniswamy is a surname. Notable people with the surname include:

K. R. Palaniswamy (born 1954), Indian gastroenterologist, medical academic, and writer
N. Palaniswamy, Indian politician
Edappadi K. Palaniswami (born 1954), Indian politician

Indian surnames